Mario Tosato (11 December 1930 – 16 January 1996) was an Italian racing cyclist. He rode in the 1957 Tour de France.

References

External links
 

1930 births
1996 deaths
Italian male cyclists
Place of birth missing
People from Castelfranco Veneto
Cyclists from the Province of Treviso